The B. M. Allen House, in Boone County, Kentucky near Union, is a house with Greek Revival and Italianate features.

It is one of 34 I-houses which then survived in the county, and was deemed a good example.

References

Houses on the National Register of Historic Places in Kentucky
Greek Revival architecture in Kentucky
Italianate architecture in Kentucky
Houses in Boone County, Kentucky
National Register of Historic Places in Boone County, Kentucky
I-houses in Kentucky